Easy Come Easy Go is a single by American rock band Winger, from their album In the Heart of the Young. Released in 1990, the song charted at #41. According to Kip Winger the song was a late addition to the track listing, written because it was felt that there were not enough rock songs on the album. "Can't Get Enuff" came about the same way.

The song was a minor pop hit, peaking at no. 41 on the Billboard Hot 100. The song had more rock success, peaking at no. 17 on the Album Rock Tracks chart.

Track listing
American CD single

European CD single

7" single

Personnel
Kip Winger – lead vocals, bass
Reb Beach – lead guitar, backing vocals
Paul Taylor – rhythm guitar, backing vocals
Rod Morgenstein – drums

Charts

References

Winger (band) songs
1990 singles
Songs written by Kip Winger
Song recordings produced by Beau Hill
1990 songs
Atlantic Records singles